Ross S. Whisler (December 3, 1891 – July 31, 1981) was an American politician from the state of Iowa.

Whisler was born in Udell, Appanoose County, Iowa in 1891. He served as a Democrat for one term in the Iowa House of Representatives from January 11, 1965 to January 8, 1967. Whisler died in his son's hometown of Mexico, Audrain County, Missouri on July 31, 1981. He was interred in Fairview Cemetery in Udell, Iowa.

References

1891 births
1981 deaths
Iowa Democrats